Lesser Slave Lake Indian Regional Council is a Tribal Council representing First Nation communities around Lesser Slave Lake in Alberta, Canada. The council is based in Slave Lake, Alberta.

Member First Nations
Current First Nation members are:
 Driftpile Cree Nation
 Kapawe'no First Nation
 Sawridge First Nation
 Sucker Creek First Nation
 Swan River First Nation

References

First Nations tribal councils
Organizations based in Alberta
First Nations in Alberta